The 2015 Crescent Cup or the 2015 Islamic Nations Rugby Championship was the first edition of the expanded annual Muslim nation teams Crescent Cup. The tournament was held in Malacca, Malaysia from 6 to 14 June 2015, sanctioned by World Rugby and co-organised with the Malaysia Rugby Union under the auspices of the Islamic Solidarity Sports Federation.

Five teams took part in the competition: Algeria, Kazakhstan, Lebanon, Malaysia and Uzbekistan. Iran, normally the sixth team, withdrew from the tournament.
Malaysia won the Championship, becoming the first team to win the tournament beating Algeria in the controversial final match, which was abandoned after a savage all-in brawl involving players, officials and spectators.

Pool stage

Pool A

Pool B

Knockout stage

Third place match

Final

References

External links
Official website

2015
2015 in Malaysian rugby union
2015 rugby union tournaments for national teams
International rugby union competitions hosted by Malaysia
2015 in Asian rugby union